Docherty is an Irish surname. Notable people with the surname include:

Bevan Docherty (born 1977), triathlete from New Zealand
Craig Docherty (born 1979), professional boxer from Scotland
David Docherty, British writer, journalist and television executive
Fiona Docherty (born 1975), multi-sport athlete and runner from New Zealand
George MacPherson Docherty (1911–2008), American Presbyterian minister
Glenn Docherty, Australian politician
Jack Docherty (born 1962), Scottish writer, actor and producer
Jacqueline Docherty, British nursing administrator
 James Docherty (1950s footballer), Scottish footballer for Queen's Park and Airdrieonians
 James Docherty (1890s footballer), Scottish footballer for Derby County and Luton Town
Jamie Docherty, Scottish football player in the early 20th century
Jim Docherty (born 1956), Scottish football player in the late 20th century
John Docherty (footballer, born 1940), Scottish football player and manager
John Docherty (footballer, born 1935), Scottish football wing half
John Docherty (boxer) (born 1997), British boxer
Laurence Docherty (born 1980), Dutch field hockey player of Scottish origin
Leo Docherty (born 1976), British politician 
Mark Docherty (born 1988), Scottish football player
 Martin Docherty (born 1971), Scottish National Party (SNP) politician, Member of Parliament (MP) for West Dunbartonshire since May 2015
Mick Docherty (born 1950), English football player and coach
Nicola Docherty (born 1992), Scottish footballer
Peter Docherty, English footballer
Richard Docherty (1899–1979), Catholic priest and missionary in Australia
Robert Docherty (born 1965), Scottish football player
Stephen Docherty (born 1976), Scottish football player
Steve Docherty (born 1950), Australian professional tennis player
Thomas Docherty (politician), British politician
Tom Docherty (1924–2020), English football player
Tommy Docherty (1928–2020), Scottish football player and manager
Tony Docherty (born 1971), Scottish football player
Valerie Docherty, Canadian politician

See also
Docherty (novel)
Glen Docherty, a valley in Wester Ross, Scotland
Doherty (surname)
Dockery

Scottish surnames
Surnames of Irish origin